Lodderia novemcarinata is a minute, sea snail or micromollusc, a marine gastropod mollusc in the family Skeneidae.

Description
The height of the shell attains 1.25 mm, its diameter 3.5 mm. The small white shell has a depressed suborbicular shape. It is deeply umbilicate. It contains 5 whorls, including two minute ones in the apex. It shows nine acute, spiral keels on the body whorl (of which the sutural and the inner umbilical keels are but weakly developed). The shell is minutely radiately, very closely striate, giving it a shagreened and silky appearance  The growth lines in the interstices are apparent. The aperture is circular and white on the inside. The peristome is continuous.

Distribution
This species occurs in the Arabian Sea off Muscat, Oman, in the northwest Indian Ocean and in the Red Sea.

References

 Bosch D.T., Dance S.P., Moolenbeek R.G. & Oliver P.G. (1995) Seashells of eastern Arabia. Dubai: Motivate Publishing. 296 pp.

External links
  JANSSEN, ZUSCHIN & BAAL:  Gastropods and their habitats from the northern Red Sea(Egypt: Safaga) Part 2: Caenogastropoda: Sorbeoconcha and Littorinimorpha; Ann. Naturhist. Mus. Wien, Serie A, Wien, Mai 2011

novemcarinata
Gastropods described in 1906